Pseuderosia cristata is a moth in the family Drepanidae. It was described by Snellen in 1889. It is found in Sundaland.

The larvae feed on Korthalsia rigida and Elaeis species.

References

Moths described in 1889
Drepaninae